"Legion Quest" is a six-part Marvel Comics crossover event involving the X-Men, published in 1994–1995. It was a prelude to the Age of Apocalypse extended storyline.

Tie-in issues
Prologue X-Factor #109
 The Uncanny X-Men #320
 X-Men Vol. 2 #40 
 The Uncanny X-Men #321
 X-Men Vol. 2 #41
Epilogue Cable #20

Collected editions

Notes

References